Lithuania participated in the Eurovision Song Contest 2021 with the song "Discoteque" written by Vaidotas Valiukevičius, Robertas Baranauskas, Mantas Banišauskas, Laisvūnas Černovas, Kalle Lindroth and Ilkka Wirtanen. The song was performed by the band The Roop. The Lithuanian broadcaster Lithuanian National Radio and Television (LRT) organised the national final  (Let's try again! 2021) in order to select the Lithuanian entry for the 2021 contest in Rotterdam, Netherlands. The national final took place over four weeks and involved 21 competing entries. The results of each show were determined by the combination of votes from a jury panel and a public vote. In the final, six artists and songs remained and "Discoteque" performed by the Roop was selected as the winner.

Lithuania was drawn to compete in the first semi-final of the Eurovision Song Contest which took place on 18 May 2021. Performing as the opening entry for the show in position 1, "Discoteque" was announced among the top 10 entries of the first semi-final and therefore qualified to compete in the final on 22 May. It was later revealed that Lithuania placed fourth out of the 16 participating countries in the semi-final with 203 points. In the final, Lithuania performed in position 18 and placed eighth out of the 26 participating countries, scoring 220 points.

Background

Prior to the 2021 Contest, Lithuania had participated in the Eurovision Song Contest twenty times since its first entry in 1994. The nation's best placing in the contest was sixth, which it achieved in 2006 with the song "We Are the Winners" performed by LT United. Following the introduction of semi-finals for the 2004, Lithuania, to this point, has managed to qualify to the final nine times. In the 2019 contest, "Run with the Lions" performed by Jurij Veklenko failed to qualify to the final.

For the 2020 contest, the Lithuanian national broadcaster, Lithuanian National Radio and Television (LRT), broadcast the event within Lithuania and organised the selection process for the nation's entry. Other than the internal selection of their debut entry in 1994, Lithuania has selected their entry consistently through a national final procedure.

Before Eurovision

Pabandom iš naujo! 2021
 (Let's try again! 2021) was the national final format developed by LRT in order to select Lithuania's entry for the Eurovision Song Contest 2021. The competition involved a six-week-long process that commenced on 16 January 2021 and concluded with a winning song and artist on 6 February 2021. The four shows took place at the LRT studios in Vilnius and were hosted by Ieva Stasiulevičiūtė, Vytautas Rumšas with Vaidas Baumila hosting segments from the green room. The shows were broadcast on LRT televizija, LRT Lituanica and LRT Radijas as well as online via the broadcaster's website lrt.lt.

Format 
The 2021 competition involved 21 entries and consisted of four shows. 20 of the entries participated in the first two shows which were the heats. Each heat consisted of 10 entries and the top five advanced to the competition's semi-final. In the semi-final, five entries were eliminated and the top five proceeded to the final. The entry entered by the Roop, which were to represent Lithuania at the Eurovision Song Contest 2020 before the event's cancellation due to the COVID-19 pandemic in Europe, competed directly in the final during which the winner was selected from the remaining six entries. The results of each of the four shows were determined by the 50/50 combination of votes from a jury panel and public televoting. The ranking developed by both streams of voting was converted to points from 1-8, 10 and 12 and assigned based on the number of competing songs in the respective show. During the first three shows, the jury panel consisted of five members, while the jury panel in the final consisted of seven members. The public could vote through telephone and SMS voting. Ties in all shows were decided in favour of the entry that received the most points from the jury.

Competing entries
On 31 March 2020, LRT opened two separate submission forms: one for artists and another for songwriters to submit their songs. Artists that applied to compete with a song were required to indicate which song they wanted to compete with on their application. The submission deadline for both applications concluded on 14 December 2020. On 3 January 2020, LRT announced the 22 artists selected for the competition. Among the artists were previous Lithuanian Eurovision contestants Evelina Sašenko, who represented Lithuania in 2011, Sunday Afternoon (Vilija Matačiūnaitė), who represented the nation in 2014, and the Roop, which were to represent the nation in 2020 before the contest was cancelled. On 4 January 2021, the final changes to the list of 22 competing acts were made with the withdrawal of the song "" performed by Evelina Sašenko, and singer Gintarė Korsakaitė.

Shows

Heats 
The two heats of the competition aired on 16 and 23 January 2021 and featured ten entries each. The respective heats were filmed on 12 and 19 January 2021. The members of the jury consisted of Ramūnas Zilnys (music reviewer; first and second heat), Vytautas Bikus (composer; first and second heat), Ieva Narkutė (singer; first and second heat), Jievaras Jasinskis (composer and musician; first heat), Aistė Smilgevičiūtė (singer; first heat), Gerūta Griniūtė (cultural presenter and event host; second heat) and Stanislavas Stavickis-Stano (singer-songwriter; second heat). The top five entries advanced to the semi-final from each heat, while the bottom five were eliminated.

Semi-final 
The semi-final of the competition aired on 30 January 2021 and featured the ten entries that qualified from the heats. The show was filmed on 26 January 2021. The members of the jury consisted of Ramūnas Zilnys (music reviewer), Aistė Smilgevičiūtė (singer), Jievaras Jasinskis (composer and musician), Gerūta Griniūtė (cultural presenter and event host) and Stanislavas Stavickis-Stano (singer-songwriter). The top five entries advanced to the final, while the bottom five were eliminated.

Final 
The final of the competition took place on 6 February 2021 and featured the remaining five entries that qualified from the semi-final alongside automatic qualifier The Roop. The final was the only show in the competition to be broadcast live; all other preceding shows were pre-recorded earlier in the week before their airdates. The members of the jury consisted of Ramūnas Zilnys (music reviewer), Aistė Smilgevičiūtė (singer), Jievaras Jasinskis (composer and musician), Gerūta Griniūtė (cultural presenter and event host), Stanislavas Stavickis-Stano (singer-songwriter), Vytautas Bikus (composer) and Ieva Narkutė (singer). "Discoteque" performed by the Roop was selected as the winner after gaining the most points from both the jury vote and the public vote.

Ratings

At Eurovision 

According to Eurovision rules, all nations with the exceptions of the host country and the "Big Five" (France, Germany, Italy, Spain and the United Kingdom) are required to qualify from one of two semi-finals in order to compete for the final; the top ten countries from each semi-final progress to the final. The European Broadcasting Union (EBU) split up the competing countries into six different pots based on voting patterns from previous contests, with countries with favourable voting histories put into the same pot. The semi-final allocation draw held for the Eurovision Song Contest 2020 on 28 January 2020 was used for the 2021 contest, which Lithuania was placed into the first semi-final, which was held on 18 May 2021, and was scheduled to perform in the first half of the show.

Once all the competing songs for the 2021 contest had been released, the running order for the semi-finals was decided by the shows' producers rather than through another draw, so that similar songs were not placed next to each other. Lithuania was set to open the show and perform in position 1, before the entry from Slovenia.

The two semi-finals and final were broadcast in Lithuania on LRT and LRT Radijas with commentary by Ramūnas Zilnys. The Lithuanian spokesperson, who announced the top 12-point score awarded by the Lithuanian jury during the final, was Andrius Mamontovas who previously represented Lithuania in 2006 as part of LT United.

Semi-final 

The Roop took part in technical rehearsals on 8 and 12 May, followed by dress rehearsals on 17 and 18 May. This included the jury show on 17 May where the professional juries of each country watched and voted on the competing entries.

The Lithuanian performance featured the members of the Roop in yellow costumes and performing on stage with pink and black stage colours and the LED screens displaying shapes, geometric images and a lightning effect. The band was joined on stage by two dancers which together performed choreography throughout the song. The performance also featured the lighting on the performers blacking out prior to the first pre-chorus to create a silhouette effect. The stage director for the Lithuanian performance was Povilas Varvuolis. The two dancers that joined the Roop on stage were Marijanas Staniulėnas and Miglė Praniauskaitė, while an off-stage backing vocalist was also featured: Algirdas Daumantas Ciūnys.

At the end of the show, Lithuania was announced as having finished in the top 10 and subsequently qualifying for the final. It was later revealed that Lithuania placed ninth in the semi-final, receiving a total of 117 points: 137 points from the televoting and 66 points from the juries.

Final 
Shortly after the first semi-final, a winners' press conference was held for the ten qualifying countries. As part of this press conference, the qualifying artists took part in a draw to determine which half of the final they would subsequently participate in. This draw was done in the order the countries were announced during the semi-final. Lithuania was drawn to compete in the second half. Following this draw, the shows' producers decided upon the running order of the final, as they had done for the semi-finals. Lithuania was subsequently placed to perform in position 18, following the entry from Bulgaria and before the entry from Ukraine.

The Roop once again took part in dress rehearsals on 21 and 22 May before the final, including the jury final where the professional juries cast their final votes before the live show. The band performed a repeat of their semi-final performance during the final on 22 May. Lithuania placed eighth in the final, scoring 220 points: 165 points from the televoting and 55 points from the juries.

Voting 
Voting during the three shows involved each country awarding two sets of points from 1-8, 10 and 12: one from their professional jury and the other from televoting. Each nation's jury consisted of five music industry professionals who are citizens of the country they represent, with a diversity in gender and age represented. The judges assess each entry based on the performances during the second Dress Rehearsal of each show, which takes place the night before each live show, against a set of criteria including: vocal capacity; the stage performance; the song's composition and originality; and the overall impression by the act. Jury members may only take part in panel once every three years, and are obliged to confirm that they are not connected to any of the participating acts in a way that would impact their ability to vote impartially. Jury members should also vote independently, with no discussion of their vote permitted with other jury members. The exact composition of the professional jury, and the results of each country's jury and televoting were released after the final; the individual results from each jury member were also released in an anonymised form.

Below is a breakdown of points awarded to Lithuania and awarded by Lithuania in the first semi-final and final of the contest, and the breakdown of the jury voting and televoting conducted during the two shows:

Points awarded to Lithuania

Points awarded by Lithuania

Detailed voting results 
The following members comprised the Lithuanian jury:
 Jievaras Jasinskis
 
 Giedrė Kilčiauskienė
 Raminta Naujanytė (Bjelle)

References 

2021
Countries in the Eurovision Song Contest 2021
Eurovision